Mesosa senilis is a species of beetle in the family Cerambycidae. It was described by Henry Walter Bates in 1884. It is known from Japan and Sakhalin.

References

senilis
Beetles described in 1884